Bullia callosa, common name the callused bullia, is a species of sea snail, a marine gastropod mollusk in the family Nassariidae, the Nassa mud snails or dog whelks.

Description
The length of the shell varies between 18 mm and 50 mm.

The shell is elongated and cylindrical.  The whole external surface is smooth, shining, of a coffee and milk color. The elongated spire is pointed. It is composed of six not convex whorls. Each whorl is covered between the sutures with a layer of matter, which assumes at the base a chestnut color. This layer is much thicker upon the body whorl, and is continued, enlarging itself, to the left lip, where it forms a large semicircular callosity, of a deep chestnut color, bordered with white. Each of the whorls of the spire is likewise separated from the others by a fawn-colored line, which is delineated a little below each suture. The aperture is ovate, of a pale fawn-color, dilated towards the middle, strongly emarginated at its base. The columella is arcuated, callous, fawn-colored and smooth. The callosity of the columella is oblique, thick, furrowed, much shorter than the outer lip. From its lower part, a stria stretches out, which is directed obliquely upon the back of the shell, to its termination at the anterior angle of the right lip, which is sharp.

Distribution
This marine species occurs from Angola to Mozambique.

References

 Marais J.P. & Kilburn R.N. (2010) Nassariidae. pp. 138–173, in: Marais A.P. & Seccombe A.D. (eds), Identification guide to the seashells of South Africa. Volume 1. Groenkloof: Centre for Molluscan Studies. 376 pp.

External links
 

Nassariidae
Gastropods described in 1828